Polynoncus gibberosus is a species of hide beetle in the subfamily Omorginae found in Chile.

References

gibberosus
Beetles described in 1990